Murphy Hot Springs is an unincorporated community in Owyhee County, Idaho, United States. It is located along Three Creek Road between Rogerson, Idaho and Jarbidge, Nevada at the bottom of the East Fork Jarbidge River's canyon. As of 2007, the community contains approximately 50 homes.

References

Unincorporated communities in Idaho
Unincorporated communities in Owyhee County, Idaho